This is a complete list of four-star admirals in the United States Public Health Service Commissioned Corps. The rank of admiral (or full admiral, or four-star admiral), ranks above vice admiral (three-star admiral) and is the highest rank achievable in the U.S. Public Health Service Commissioned Corps. 

There have been six four-star admirals in the history of the U.S. Public Health Service Commissioned Corps. All six were directly commissioned into the regular corps. One was already an officer in the regular corps and the other five were originally civilians who were appointed to the regular corps and to grade upon taking office.

List of admirals

The following lists of four-star admirals are sortable by last name, date of rank. The date listed is that of the officer's first promotion to admiral, and may differ from the officer's entry in the U.S. Public Health Service register. The year commissioned is taken to be the year the officer was directly commissioned which may precede the officer's actual date of commission by up to two years. Each entry lists the admiral's name, date of rank, active-duty position held while serving at four-star rank, number of years of active-duty service at four-star rank (Yrs), year commissioned and source of commission, number of years in commission when promoted to four-star rank (YC), and other biographical notes.

1988–present

See also
 Admiral (United States)
 List of active duty United States four-star officers
 List of United States Army four-star generals
 List of United States Marine Corps four-star generals
 List of United States Navy four-star admirals
 List of United States Air Force four-star generals
 List of United States Space Force four-star generals
 List of United States Coast Guard four-star admirals
 List of United States Public Health Service Commissioned Corps vice admirals
 List of United States military leaders by rank

Lists of admirals
Four-star officers